Kubaba was a Syrian goddess associated particularly closely with Alalakh and Carchemish. She was adopted into the Hurrian and Hittite pantheons as well. After the fall of the Hittite empire, she continued to be venerated by Luwians.

Name
The precise linguistic origin of Kubaba's name is unknown, but it is assumed it was not Semitic. She was likely one of the deities belonging to a linguistic and religious substrate from ancient Syria, similar to Ishara. However, unlike other such deities, Kubaba is not attested in documents from Ebla. Typical forms of the name include dKu-ba-ba and, in Hittite sources, dKu-pa-pa. The alphabetic Ugaritic spelling was kbb, while hieroglyphic Luwian - (DEUS)ku-AVIS. Aramaic texts also spell the name as kbb.

A connection between her and the similarly named legendary Sumerian queen Kubaba of Kish, while commonly proposed, cannot be established due to spatial and temporal differences. Spelling of the name of the latter alternates between Kubaba and Ku-Bau, and it is a theophoric name invoking the tutelary goddess of Lagash, Bau. Giovani Marchesi concludes that Bau, rather than Baba, was most likely the original pronunciation at the time when the orthography of the name was standardized in the third millennium BCE.

Character and iconography

Hurro-Hittite ritual texts offer little information about the character of Kubaba and specifics of her cult. According to Alfonso Archi, she was a goddess of lawsuits. Luwian sources from Carchemish describe her as benevolent.

While such a possibility has been proposed in scholarship in the past, neither Hurrian, Hittite nor Luwian sources contain any evidence of Kubaba being a mother goddess.

Relief carvings, such as these presently housed at the Museum of Anatolian Civilizations in Ankara indicate that her attributes were a mirror and a pomegranate. Reliefs from the kingdom of Sam'al depicting a goddess holding a mirror are also interpreted as representations of Kubaba.

Attestations 

Kubaba appears for the first time in documents from the old Assyrian period, but the majority of early references come from level VII at Alalakh, where she frequently appears in theophoric names. Manfred Hutter argues that the Amik Valley, corresponding to the ancient state of Mukish, and especially its capital Alalakh were the area where she was originally worshiped and that she only spread to Carchemish and Anatolia from there. A cylinder seal presumed to originally come from Ugarit dated to around 1770 BCE already links her with Carchemish, specifically with princess Matrunna, daughter of Aplahanda. Sources from the Middle Bronze Age indicate that she was one of the three principal deities of Carchemish, the other two being Nergal and Nubandag.

In texts from the Bogazköy Archive she appears among the deities mentioned in kaluti (offering lists) of the Hurrian goddess Hebat, usually alongside Adamma, Hašuntarhi, or both of them, indicating that her cult reached the Hittite empire as one of the Hurrian or Hurrianized Syrian cults present in Kizzuwatna. 

In first millennium BCE Luwian sources she was associated with Carchemish and often referred to as its "queen" (Luwian: karkamisizas hasusaras). Kings of this city often invoked her, and at least one of them used the epithet "beloved of Kubaba.". Her cult also spread to Kommagene, Malatya, and other settlements.

Some evidence shows that in addition to Luwians, Arameans also integrated Kubaba into their pantheon in the first millennium BCE. Bel-Eresh, a ruler of Shadikanni who was a contemporary of Ashur-resh-ishi I, renovated the temple of Samnuha and a deity identified by Stephanie Dalley as Kubaba, but whose name was actually spelled dGu-ba-ba. Whether Gubaba, also known from the Assyrian Takultu ritual, as well as other ritual texts and the god list An-Anum, was the same deity as Kubaba is uncertain. and there are also proposals that this name refers to a masculine deity similar to either Nergal or Amurru.

There are also infrequent references to her in Lydian sources, likely indicating transmission of Luwian traditions. A tomb inscription mentions Kubaba alongside the god Sandas and the marivda deities, and Kubebe of Sardis mentioned by Herodotus is likely to be the same goddess.

Mythology
In the Hurrian Kumarbi cycle, known mostly from Hittite translations, she plays a minor role, appearing in the Song of LAMMA, an early section of the cycle dealing with the conflict between Teshub and an unspecified tutelary god whose name was represented by the Sumerian logogram LAMMA. After LAMMA starts to neglect his duties as freshly appointed king of gods, she urges him to pay attention to senior deities like Kumarbi and the "former gods" inhabiting the underworld, but he seemingly does not follow her advice and eventually loses his position as a result. It is assumed that LAMMA should be understood as Karhuha, a Hurrian god from Carchemish first attested in the fourteenth century BCE. A god whose name was written with the ideogram LAMMA is also associated with Kubaba in a fragmentary ritual text with instructions for a festival.

Associations with other deities
In Hurrian sources, Kubaba was usually paired with Adamma. Sometimes the pair was expanded into a trio with the addition of the goddess Hasuntarhi. In rituals linked to the hišuwa festival she was associated with Adamma and Nupatik. In Luwian texts she appears with Tarhunza and Karhuha.

Kubaba and Cybele
Emmanuel Laroche proposed in 1960 that Kubaba and Cybele were one and the same. This view is supported by Mark Munn, who argues that the Phrygian name Kybele developed from Lydian adjective kuvavli, first changed into kubabli and then simplified into kuballi and finally kubelli. However, such an adjective is a purely speculative construction.

Manfred Hutter is skeptical if Cybele developed from Kubaba, as the latter never reached Phrygia, lacks a connection to mountains, is not regarded as a mother goddess in known sources and seemingly did not have a consort, being instead associated with various deities in various locations. He assumes that the spread of Phrygian influence combined with Persians burning down the Kubebe temple in Sardis lead to the downfall of Kubaba's cult in Lydia, noting that even Lydian royalty was involved in the cult of Phrygian matar Kubileya (Cybele) in later times. He proposes that the two were at most confused in later sources due to superficially similar names.

References

Bibliography

External links

Hurrian deities
West Semitic goddesses
Tutelary deities
Hittite deities
Luwian goddesses
Ugaritic deities
Anatolian deities